William Henry Olds (born February 21, 1951) is a former professional football player, a running back in the NFL for four seasons for the Baltimore Colts, the Seattle Seahawks, and the Philadelphia Eagles.  He was selected by the Colts in the third round of the 1973 NFL Draft, the 61st overall pick.

Nebraska Cornhuskers
Olds graduated from high school in 1969 and played college football at Nebraska under head coach Bob Devaney, with future head coach Tom Osborne as offensive coordinator.  He was the fullback in the I formation, the lead blocker for tailbacks Jeff Kinney and Johnny Rodgers, the 1972 Heisman Trophy winner. Nebraska won national championships in 1970 and 1971, and a third straight Orange Bowl following the 1972 season to finish at fourth in the AP poll. The Huskers went 33–2–2 (.919) in those three seasons (1970–72).

1951 births
Living people
Sportspeople from Kansas City, Kansas
Players of American football from Kansas
American football running backs
Nebraska Cornhuskers football players
Baltimore Colts players
Seattle Seahawks players
Philadelphia Eagles players